The General Federation of Trade Unions (GFTU) is the sole national trade union center in Syria, it was founded in 1948. By a 1968 decree establishing a single-trade-union system, all trade unions in the country are required to  be affiliated to the GFTU, and the GFTU has the power to dissolve the executive committee of any union.

The union is closely linked with the Syrian Regional Branch of the Arab Socialist Ba'ath Party, and the president of the GFTU, Shaaban Azzouz, is a member of the party.

The GFTU is affiliated with the World Federation of Trade Unions and the International Confederation of Arab Trade Unions.

References

 

Economy of the Arab League
International Confederation of Arab Trade Unions
Organizations associated with the Ba'ath Party
Trade unions established in 1948
Trade unions in Syria
World Federation of Trade Unions